Beaucoup Creek is a major tributary of the Big Muddy River in Illinois. The name is pronounced locally as in "Ba Cou".

Cities and counties
The following cities are in the Beaucoup Creek watershed:
Pinckneyville
Vergennes

Parts of the following counties are drained by Beaucoup Creek:
Jackson County
Perry County
Washington County

See also
List of Illinois rivers

References

External links
Prairie Rivers Network

Rivers of Illinois
Tributaries of the Mississippi River
Rivers of Jackson County, Illinois
Rivers of Perry County, Illinois
Rivers of Washington County, Illinois